The Gray Wolf River is a river of the Olympic Peninsula in Washington. It is a tributary of the Dungeness River. It heads near Gray Wolf Pass and drains the west slope of The Needles.

See also
 List of rivers of Washington

References

Rivers of Washington (state)
Rivers of Clallam County, Washington
Rivers of Jefferson County, Washington